Solanke (सोळंके) is the surname of a prominent 96k Maratha clan, mostly from Maharashtra and neighbouring states in India.

Titles associated with the Solanke group include Raje, Sardar, Sarkar, Deshmukh, and Patil. Their major centre is Majalgaon in Beed District, Maharashtra. They have also scattered through regions of Maratha dominance such as Beed, Akola, Buldana, Parbhani, Jalna, Aurangabad, Solapur, Latur, Nagpur, Amravati, Baroda, Gwalior, Satara, and Kolhapur and some other parts of India.

Surname include in this clan are Salunke, Pandhare, Patankar, Patole, Shevale, Babar, Padwal, Magar, Randheer, Ranpise, Sonvane, Gunjal, Lahane, Vyawahare, Navale, Londhe.

Prominent Maratha leader and former Deputy Chief Minister of Maharashtra Shrimant Sundarrao Solankhe belonged to this clan.

Origin
The solunke clan deccant from chalukyas .

See also
 Sundarrao Solanke
 Prakashdada Solanke

References

People from Maharashtra